Maban, mabain or mabanba is a material that is held to be magical in Australian Aboriginal mythology. It is the material from which the shamans and elders of indigenous Australia supposedly derive their magical powers.

Among the Ngaanyatjarra people, practitioners are known as maparn or maparnjarra.

References

 A. P. Elkin (1973). Aboriginal Men of High Degree: Initiation and Sorcery in the World's Oldest Tradition. Inner Traditions. 
 Munn, Nancy D. (1984). "The Transformation Of Subjects Into Objects in Walbiri and Pitjantjartjara Myths." In: M. Charlesworth, H. Morphy, D. Bell and K. Maddock, Eds. Religion in Aboriginal Australia:  An Anthology.  St. Lucia, Queensland:  University Of Queensland Press.

Australian Aboriginal mythology
Mythological objects